Jaime Lazcano Escolá (5 March 1909 – 1 June 1983), was a Spanish footballer who played as a midfielder for Real Madrid, Atlético Madrid and Spain during the 1920s and 1930s. He scored the first ever La Liga goal for Real Madrid on 10 February 1929, and scored four goals in a 5–0 win against Europa.

He was nicknamed "Dramaturgo" as in his time away from football he was a playwright, débuting several of his plays in the town of San Lorenzo de El Escorial.

Honours
Real Madrid

Spanish Championship: 1931–32, 1932–33
Copa del Rey: 1933–34

References

External links

 

1909 births
1983 deaths
Spanish footballers
Spain international footballers
La Liga players
Real Madrid CF players
Lazcano Jaime
Association football midfielders
Footballers from Pamplona